Gordon Hellwig (5 February 1901 – 24 May 1964) was a former Australian rules footballer who played with Fitzroy in the Victorian Football League (VFL).

He transferred to Williamstown in the VFA in 1929 and played 60 games and kicked 51 goals up until he injured his knee in a charity match against the VFL in June 1932 and never played again. He was captain-coach for part of the 1931 VFA season. and was captain in 1932 until he injured his knee.

See also
 1927 Melbourne Carnival

Notes

External links 
		

1901 births
1964 deaths
Australian rules footballers from Victoria (Australia)
Fitzroy Football Club players
Williamstown Football Club players
Williamstown Football Club coaches